Eurydactylodes occidentalis is a species of gecko, a lizard in the family Diplodactylidae. The species is endemic to Grande Terre in New Caledonia.

Habitat

Description
E. occidentalis is the smallest species in its genus. Its maximum recorded snout-to-vent length (SVL) is only .

Reproduction
E. occidentalis is oviparous.

References

Further reading
Bauer AM, Jackman TR, Sadlier RA, Whitaker AH (2009). "Review and phylogeny of the New Caledonian diplodactylid gekkotan genus Eurydactylodes Wermuth, 1965, with the description of a new species". Mémoires du Muséum national d'Histoire naturelle 198: 13–36. (Eurydactylodes occidentalis, new species).
Langner C, Schönecker P (2018). "Pacific Lost World – die weniger bekkante, gefährdete Geckofauna Neukaledoniens ". Terraria-Elaphe (69): 14–26. (in German).

Eurydactylodes
Geckos of New Caledonia
Reptiles described in 2009
Taxa named by Aaron M. Bauer
Taxa named by Todd R. Jackman
Taxa named by Ross Allen Sadlier
Taxa named by Anthony Whitaker